M. P. Shah English High School is a private, co-educational English Medium High School in Vile Parle, Mumbai recognized by the Government of Maharashtra. The school follows the Secondary School Certificate(SSC) State board syllabus.

History
The school was established in 1981 by Bhagini Seva Mandir Kumarika Stree Mandal.

Sections
Play Group
Pre-Primary
Primary
Secondary

Spectrum
The school publishes an annual magazine Spectrum which includes articles by the school faculty as well as the students.

Annual Day- "Horizon"
It usually takes place in December and is showcase of extracurricular talent by students.

Achievements
The school has obtained consecutive 100% passing result since past 20 years.
Mrs. Renu Dhotre is one of the writers for the English Balbharti(State Board of Maharashtra) and also a Master Trainer of British council in collaboration with RMSA.

References

High schools and secondary schools in Mumbai
Educational institutions established in 1981
1981 establishments in Maharashtra